The Stephen Perse Foundation is a family of private schools in Cambridge and Saffron Walden for students aged 1 to 18.

The Foundation is made up of 3 nurseries (2 in Cambridge and 1 in Saffron Walden, Essex) for ages 1–5, 2 Junior Schools (Junior School Rosedale House in Cambridge and Junior School Dame Bradbury's in Saffron Walden, Essex) for ages 5–11, a Senior School for ages 11–16 (boys joined Year 7 for the first time in September 2017); and the Stephen Perse Sixth Form, for students aged 16–18. The school has a strong reputation for academic excellence and a progressive attitude towards learning and social skills, being named the top Independent school in East Anglia by The Sunday Times on their 'Parent Power' list in 2016. In 2018, Cambridge Centre for Sixth Form Studies joined the Stephen Perse Sixth Form. The Foundation is a registered charity under English law.

History
In 1615, Dr Perse's will included a bequest of land for the establishment of what was then described as a Grammar Free School, in Cambridge. It became The Perse School and was originally reserved for boys. It developed along separate lines and operates as a separate organization today, providing coeducational education from ages 3 to 18.

In 1881, the complementary but unconnected Perse School for Girls opened, as part of the strong 19th-century movement to educate women. From the Perse School for Girls, the Foundation developed to become the Stephen Perse Foundation in 2007. It opened a co-educational sixth form in 2008. It now provides a complete educational pathway for boys and girls from age 1 to 18.

Writer and cartoonist Ronald Searle drew from the Foundation and Cambridgeshire High School for Girls (now Long Road Sixth Form College) as inspiration for his St Trinian's School books (published 1946 to 1952), which portrayed the girls at a boarding school as juvenile delinquents. Searle donated original manuscripts and diaries to the school, which are held in the school archive. This material includes a letter, dated 1993, which confirms the link.

Around the turn of the 20th century, the school accepted boys into its kindergarten, including a young John Maynard Keynes.

In September 2013, Dame Bradbury's School in Saffron Walden joined the Foundation, as a non-selective school for boys and girls aged 1–11. At the same time, announcements were made of major development plans to admit boys to Rosedale House (then known as the Junior School) and Senior Schools. Boys started at Rosedale House in Cambridge in September 2014, and at the Senior School in 2017, with classes from Year 5 through to Year 11 being taught in a diamond formation. This combines the academic benefits of single-sex learning with the social advantages of a co-educational environment.

Awards and accolades
In 2013, the Sunday Times named the Foundation the International Baccalaureate (IB) School of the Year for the second time. The paper said: "Students at the Stephen Perse 6th Form College in Cambridge are world-class achievers. Their exceptional academic results this year mean that the school is not only ranked first in Britain but also joint first in the world for the international baccalaureate (IB) diploma."

In November 2014, the school was awarded the title Independent School of the Year 2014 and also "Outstanding Strategic Initiative" by the Independent School Awards, decided by a panel of independent judges, including the Chief Inspector of the Independent Schools Inspectorate, Christine Ryan.

In November 2016, the Foundation was named the Best Independent School in East Anglia by The Sunday Times on its 'Parent Power' list. The list is acknowledged as the 'most authoritative survey' of the county's best schools, according to the newspaper. The Foundation was ranked at number 18 in a list of 2,000 schools around the United Kingdom. The accolade was based on GCSE and A Level results – 97.6% of A Level students achieved A* to B grades and 86.1% of GCSE students achieved A* and A grades. In 2017, The same Parent Power survey ranked the school number 40 in the UK and, in 2018, number 74.

The Foundation was shortlisted for Digital innovation/ed tech school of the year at the TES Schools Awards 2017.

In 2020 the Senior School received the Sunday Times Schools Guide 2021 award for East Anglia Independent Secondary School of the Decade.

Site and facilities
The main school site occupies a city block, three sides bordered by residential streets and the fourth by the University of Cambridge Department of Chemistry. This houses the Stephen Perse Senior School (ages 11–16), with Rosedale House (ages 3–11) occupying a site close by. The Stephen Perse Pre-Prep was established in 2010, after the Foundation purchased the Madingley site on the retirement of the previous owners.

In 2017, the school completed a major building project on the main site. It now offers an indoor sports hall, a rooftop multi-use games area, 10 new classrooms, and flexible learning spaces.

The main site includes a dining room, hall, library, visual arts centre, and a sick bay, with renovations in other classrooms. All classrooms contain interactive whiteboards. There is a class 3 listed gymnasium on site too, as well as ICT rooms, which are available to use before school, after school, and at lunchtimes.

In 2013, the refurbished library and classrooms in Rosedale House were covered by The Guardian newspaper in a feature on inspirational teaching spaces.

The school also contains astroturf playing fields, a fenland nature reserve, and a pavilion.

Pupils
There are currently approximately 800 pupils: 80 in the Pre-Prep, 140 in Rosedale House, and 140 in the Sixth Form; and 450 in the Senior School. Usually there are four classes in years 7 and 8, and five classes in years 9, 10 and 11. In Rosedale House, there are two classes in years 3, 4, 5, and 6.

Each pupil and teacher is part of a house named after a notable contributor to the school, for example, head teachers and people who donated money to the school. The houses are:

 Cattley
 Clark
 Kennett
 Pollock
 Rose
 Street
 Sutherland

The plans to introduce iPads for educational use in the Senior School started in September 2012. This was extended to the Sixth Form from September 2013.

In 2013 it was announced that the school will be accepting boys for the first time in to Rosedale House in 2014 and then the Senior school in 2017, becoming coeducational.

Curriculum
There is a large range of opportunities for learning at the Stephen Perse. Students learn French from Year 3 and Spanish from year 4, and can choose to learn German, Mandarin Chinese, or Russian from year 9.
 
For GCSE, there are many options available, with students taking 10 or 11 GCSEs. All students take Maths, English Language, and English Literature IGCSEs. In addition to this, students have the option to either chose to take 'triple science' consisting of Biology, Chemistry and Physics GCSEs or to take 'combined science' where the pupils are still educated in all three sciences, but only achieve 2 GCSEs as there is less content to learn overall. Students also must take an IGCSE in French, Spanish, German or Mandarin Chinese. Students then choose up to four options if they take triple science, or five if they take combined science from History, Geography, Religious Studies,  German, Mandarin Chinese, Art, Drama, Design and Technology, Music, Latin, and Greek. Critical Thinking is taught as a non-examined course, as is Physical Education. Students can take a short course Physical Education GCSE as an extra-curricular activity.

Recently, a new lesson was introduced in Rosedale House: Thinking Skills. This includes a range of topics from social to political, encouraging sharing points of view through debating, and asking questions about the wider world. It is based around the Philosophy for Children programme (P4C).

The Sixth Form students choose either the International Baccalaureate Diploma Programme or A Levels (Music is taught through the Cambridge Pre-U qualification). All students in the Sixth Form take the IB course in Theory of Knowledge. From September 2013, A Level students will also have the opportunity to take an Extended Essay (from the IB) for qualification.

The school has been an International Baccalaureate World School since 2007 and was named the Sunday Times IB School of the year in 2010 and 2013.

In 2013 the school was reported as holding the joint-highest IB results in the world, with a student average score of 42.2 points. In 2018, the average IB points score was 36, as reported in the Sunday Times Parent Power Survey ranking.

The school makes extensive use of technology in the curriculum. It has been featured by BBC News regarding the innovatory use of iTunes U courses.

Sport and the arts

Younger pupils play hockey, netball, rounders and tennis. They also do gymnastics and Athletics, and the school offers a range of sports clubs. When students reach Year 9, they can be instructed in rowing, volleyball, basketball, squash, badminton, cricket, touch rugby, lacrosse and dance. Many Stephen Perse teams compete regionally in hockey, rounders, netball, and tennis and several students compete at National level in their chosen sports. In 2013 there was a hockey tour to South Africa.

Drama is taught throughout the school. Every year group is given the chance to perform in a play, or help backstage or with lighting. Every other year, Years 10-12 put on a musical, which is performed at the Mumford Theatre. Each year in Rosedale House, Year 5s are the main focus of the Christmas Concert, and near the end of the Spring Term, the Year 6s put on a play as well. At the end of every year, the Year 4s also put on a show, accompanied by the other Years in singing.

Students have the chance to try Fine Art, from painting to drawing to sculpting, Textiles, which includes fashion designing and creations with a variety of materials, and Digital Media on the Macs.

There are many orchestras and choirs that students can join. The Singers, a choir open from Year 10, regularly goes on choir tours in Europe, and sometimes sings Evensong at Ely Cathedral. There is also a Senior School Chamber Choir, and a Middle School Chamber Choir, which have around 15 students in each by audition, and the Jazz Singers, Year 7 choir, Middle School Choir, and Year 7 boys choir, which are attendable by all. There is a Christmas carol service, a spring concert and Jazz on a Summer's Evening.

Extracurricular activities

The Stephen Perse Foundation holds the British Council International School Award in recognition of the work the school undertakes with schools in Finland, Hungary, Portugal, Italy, France, Russia, Spain, Germany and Japan.

The school has a speaker programme.

Lord Williams of Oystermouth, Master of Magdalene College, Cambridge and former Archbishop of Canterbury, spoke at the leavers' service in 2013.

Notable alumni

 Margery Allingham (1904–1966), writer
 Taqui Altounyan (1917–1992), writer and traveller
 Anne Atkins, novelist, broadcaster and journalist
 Anna Bidder (1903–2001), zoologist and co-founder of Lucy Cavendish College, Cambridge 
 Vicki Butler-Henderson (b. 1972), racing driver and TV presenter
 Prof Christine Carpenter (b. 1946), historian, Cambridge University
 Olive Cook (1912–2002), writer and artist
 Stephanie Cook (b. 1972), modern pentathlete, 2000 Olympic gold medallist
 Anastasia de Waal, head of family and education at Civitas 
 Christine Hamill (1923–1956), mathematician
 Jacquetta Hawkes (1910–1996), archaeologist and writer
 Lucy Hawking (b. 1970), journalist and novelist
 Miriam Hodgson (1938–2005), editor of children's books
 Sharon Hunt (b. 1977), equestrian and 2008 Olympic medal-winner
 Bridget Kendall (b. 1956), BBC diplomatic correspondent
 Helen King (police officer) (b. 1965), Principal of St Anne's College, Oxford and senior police officer
 Nicola Lindsay, novelist, broadcaster and actor
 E. Jennifer Monaghan, reading educator and historian of literary education
 Philippa Pearce (1920–2006), children's author
 Jean Rhys (1890–1979), author, known for Wide Sargasso Sea 
 Angela Rumbold (b. 1932), politician
 Rosalind Runcie, pianist and wife of the Archbishop of Canterbury
 Phyllis Starkey (b. 1947), MP, biomedical researcher
 Meriol Trevor (1919–2000), writer
 Barbara Wootton,(1897–1988) economist, sociologist, Labour politician
 Sarah Martins da Silva, gynaecologist and scientist

Headteachers

 Miss Street 1881–1909
 Miss Kennett 1909–1926
 Miss Cattley 1926–1947
 Miss Scott 1947–1967
 Miss Bedson 1967–1979
 Miss Bateman 1979–1989
 Miss Smith 1989–2001
 Miss Kelleher 2001–2020
 Mr Girvan 2020-

See also
 Perse School

References

External links
 The Stephen Perse Foundation – official website

Educational institutions established in 1881
Schools in Cambridge
Private schools in Cambridgeshire
Girls' schools in Cambridgeshire
1881 establishments in England
Member schools of the Girls' Schools Association
Diamond schools
Charities based in Cambridgeshire